In mathematics, specifically in category theory, hom-sets (i.e. sets of morphisms between objects) give rise to important functors to the category of sets. These functors are called hom-functors and have numerous applications in category theory and other branches of mathematics.

Formal definition
Let C be a locally small category (i.e. a category for which hom-classes are actually sets and not proper classes).

For all objects A and B in C we define two functors to the category of sets as follows:
{| class=wikitable
|-
! Hom(A, –) : C → Set
! Hom(–, B) : C → Set
|-
| This is a covariant functor given by:
 Hom(A, –) maps each object X in C to the set of morphisms, Hom(A, X)
 Hom(A, –) maps each morphism f : X → Y to the function
 Hom(A, f) : Hom(A, X) → Hom(A, Y) given by
  for each g in Hom(A, X).
| This is a contravariant functor given by:
 Hom(–, B) maps each object X in C to the set of morphisms, Hom(X, B)
 Hom(–, B) maps each morphism h : X → Y to the function
 Hom(h, B) : Hom(Y, B) → Hom(X, B) given by
  for each g in Hom(Y, B).
|}
The functor Hom(–, B) is also called the functor of points of the object B.

Note that fixing the first argument of Hom naturally gives rise to a covariant functor and fixing the second argument naturally gives a contravariant functor. This is an artifact of the way in which one must compose the morphisms.

The pair of functors Hom(A, –) and Hom(–, B) are related in a natural manner. For any pair of morphisms f : B → B′ and h : A′ → A the following diagram commutes:

Both paths send g : A → B to f∘g∘h : A′ → B′.

The commutativity of the above diagram implies that Hom(–, –) is a bifunctor from C × C to Set which is contravariant in the first argument and covariant in the second. Equivalently, we may say that Hom(–, –) is a bifunctor
 Hom(–, –) : Cop × C → Set
where Cop is the opposite category to C.  The notation HomC(–, –) is sometimes used for Hom(–, –) in order to emphasize the category forming the domain.

Yoneda's lemma

Referring to the above commutative diagram, one observes that every morphism
 h : A′ → A

gives rise to a natural transformation
 Hom(h, –) : Hom(A, –) → Hom(A′, –)

and every morphism
 f : B → B′

gives rise to a natural transformation
 Hom(–, f) : Hom(–, B) → Hom(–, B′)

Yoneda's lemma implies that every natural transformation between Hom functors is of this form. In other words, the Hom functors give rise to a full and faithful embedding of the category C into the functor category SetCop (covariant or contravariant depending on which Hom functor is used).

Internal Hom functor
Some categories may possess a functor that behaves like a Hom functor, but takes values in the category C itself, rather than Set. Such a functor is referred to as the internal Hom functor, and is often written as
 
to emphasize its product-like nature, or as
 
to emphasize its functorial nature, or sometimes merely in lower-case:  
  For examples, see Category of relations.
Categories that possess an internal Hom functor are referred to as closed categories. One has that 
 ,
where I is the unit object of the closed category. For the case of a closed monoidal category, this extends to the notion of currying, namely, that
 
where  is a bifunctor, the internal product functor defining a monoidal category. The isomorphism is natural in both X and Z. In other words, in a closed monoidal category, the internal Hom functor is an adjoint functor to the internal product functor. The object  is called the internal Hom.

Internal Homs, when chained together, form a language, called the internal language of the category. The most famous of these are simply typed lambda calculus, which is the internal language of Cartesian closed categories, and the linear type system, which is the internal language of closed symmetric monoidal categories.

Properties
Note that a functor of the form
 Hom(–, A) : Cop → Set

is a presheaf; likewise, Hom(A, –) is a copresheaf.

A functor F : C → Set that is naturally isomorphic to Hom(A, –) for some A in C is called a representable functor (or representable copresheaf); likewise, a contravariant functor equivalent to Hom(–, A) might be called corepresentable.

Note that Hom(–, –) : Cop × C → Set is a profunctor, and, specifically, it is the identity profunctor .

In a certain sense, this can be taken as the definition of a limit or colimit.

The endofunctor Hom(E, –) : Set → Set can be given the structure of a monad; this monad is called the environment (or reader) monad.

Other properties
If A is an abelian category and A is an object of A, then HomA(A, –) is a covariant left-exact functor from A to the category Ab of abelian groups. It is exact if and only if A is projective.

Let R be a ring and M a left R-module. The functor HomR(M, –): Mod-R → Ab is adjoint to the tensor product functor – R M: Ab → Mod-R.

See also
 Ext functor
 Functor category
 Representable functor

Notes

References

External links 
 
 

Functors